The Association of Indonesia Futsal Academy, commonly called AAFI (Indonesian: Asosiasi Akademi Futsal Indonesia) is the sole, independent body directly representing youth futsal at Indonesia level. AAFI exists to protect and promote Indonesian youth futsal. Its aim is to create a new, more democratic governance model that truly reflects the key role of youth development in futsal.

History 
At the date of March 10, 2013 the association was officially formed as a place for youth futsal player in Indonesia. The Association aims to develop futsal sport since the age of six to sixteen years with regular competitions held annually.

Structure 
The AAFI Executive Board currently stands as such:

Board of Advisors
 Taufik Jursal Effendi

Head of Organization and Financial Affairs
 Ikhlas Bahar
 Arif Isnawan

Head of Marketing and Public Relations
 Ferdiansyah

Head of Development of Achievement and Competition
 Sayan Karmadi
 Wahyu Tri

Head of Information, Communications and Research Development
 David D. Nanulaita

AAFI Tournament 
AAFI covering certain tournament in the inaugural edition in 2013, just compare the two age categories is the category under-13 years of age and under-16 years of age.

Under-13

Under-16

References

Futsal in Indonesia
Futsal